Bové may refer to:

 José Bové (born 1953), French farmer, politician and syndicalist
 Joseph Bové (1784–1834), Russian architect
 Paul Bové (born 1949), American academic and writer

See also
 Bove, a surname (including a list of people with the name)
 Boves (disambiguation)
 Bovee (disambiguation)